Kamnik (or Stein in Oberkrain) is a town in northern Slovenia. It is the central settlement of the Municipality of Kamnik. It encompasses a large part of the Kamnik Alps and the surrounding area. The town of Kamnik has three castles as well as many examples of historical architecture.

History
The name Kamnik was first mentioned  in the 11th century. The first time it was mentioned as a town was in 1229, when it was an important trading post on the road between Ljubljana and Celje. This makes the town one of the oldest in Slovenia. In the Middle Ages, Kamnik had its own mint and some aristocratic families among its residents. The town was among the most influential centers of power for the Bavarian counts of Andechs in the region of Carniola at the time. The only remnant of the Bavarian nobility are the two ruined castles which are both strategically built on high ground near the town center. The Franciscan monastery built in the town itself is a testament to its importance. The building is well preserved and has undergone extensive renovation in recent years.

Historical suburbs of the town include Šut(i)na, Na Produ, Novi Trg, Pred Mostom, Graben, and Podgoro. In 1934 the following formerly independent settlements were annexed by Kamnik: Fužine, Žale (in older sources also Žalje), Zaprice, Kratno, Pugled, Zgornje Perovo, Spodnje Perovo, Bakovnik, and the lower part of Mekinje.

Most of the old town center is built in an Austro-Hungarian style. Most of the facades have been renovated in recent years but the process is still ongoing.

Mass grave
Kamnik is the site of a mass grave from the period immediately after the Second World War. The Cuzak Meadow Mass Grave is located in the southeast part of the town, in a grassy area encircled by a road on the premises of the Svit factory. The grave contains the remains of several hundred soldiers and civilians, mostly Croats but also some Serbs, that were murdered on 11 May 1945.

Notable people
Notable people that were born or lived in Kamnik include:
Fran Albreht (1889–1963), author
France Balantič (1921–1943), poet
Jurij Japelj (1744–1807), philologist
Rudolf Maister (1874–1934), military leader
Jakob Savinšek (1922–1961), sculptor and illustrator
Bojan Kraut (1908–1991), engineer
Marjan Šarec (born 1977), politician and actor

Gallery

References

External links

 Kamnik on Geopedia
 
 Visit Kamnik, official page of tourist information centre
 Kamnik, official page of municipality (in Slovene)
 Kamnik: virtual panoramas. Burger.si.

 
Cities and towns in Upper Carniola
Populated places in the Municipality of Kamnik